Rissoa parva is a species of minute sea snail, a marine gastropod mollusc or micromollusc in the family Rissoidae.

Taxonomy

The status of R. interrupta in relation to R. parva is still a point of discussion. Based on research of Wigham (1975), R. interrupta is considered by many authors as a variety of form of R. parva (Fretter & Graham, 1778; McKay & Smith, 1979). Nordsieck (1968) and Verduin (1976) think however that R. interrupta and R. parva are two different species. Both species have a sympatric appearance.

Description

Distribution
This species occurs in European waters, the Mediterranean Sea and the Black Sea. Fossils have been found in Quaternary strata of Rhodos, Greece.

References

 Da Costa E. M. (1778). Historia Naturalis Testaceorum Britanniae. London: Millan, White, Elmsley & Robson XII + 254 + VIII p., 17 pl
 Backeljau, T. (1986). Lijst van de recente mariene mollusken van België [List of the recent marine molluscs of Belgium]. Koninklijk Belgisch Instituut voor Natuurwetenschappen: Brussels, Belgium. 106 pp.
 Harms, J., 1993. Check list of species (algae, invertebrates and vertebrates) found in the vicinity of the island of Helgoland (North Sea, German Bight) - a review of recent records. Helgoländer Meeresuntersuch. 47 1: 1-34.
  Gofas, S.; Le Renard, J.; Bouchet, P. (2001). Mollusca, in: Costello, M.J. et al. (Ed.) (2001). European register of marine species: a check-list of the marine species in Europe and a bibliography of guides to their identification. Collection Patrimoines Naturels, 50: pp. 180–213
 Muller, Y. (2004). Faune et flore du littoral du Nord, du Pas-de-Calais et de la Belgique: inventaire. [Coastal fauna and flora of the Nord, Pas-de-Calais and Belgium: inventory]. Commission Régionale de Biologie Région Nord Pas-de-Calais: France. 307 pp.

External links
  Ponder W. F. (1985). A review of the Genera of the Rissoidae (Mollusca: Mesogastropoda: Rissoacea). Records of the Australian Museum supplement 4: 1-221 p. 21

Rissoidae
Molluscs of the Atlantic Ocean
Molluscs of the Black Sea
Molluscs of the Mediterranean Sea
Taxa named by Emanuel Mendes da Costa
Gastropods described in 1778